Yelasi is a small village in Sorab Taluk in Shimoga district of Karnataka state, India. It belongs to the Bangalore division. It is located 83 km towards the west from district headquarters, Shimoga.

Demographics

The local language is Kannada.

Education
Schools in Yelasi include:

 Ghps Yelasi

References

Villages in Shimoga district